Pidhaichyky is a village in Lviv Raion, Lviv Oblast of Ukraine. Until 18 July 2020, it belonged to Zolochiv Raion. As a result of the administrative reform of Ukraine, which reduced the number of raions of Lviv Oblast to seven, Pidhaichyky was moved to a newly established Lviv Raion. The area of Dolynska Raion was merged into Kropyvnytskyi Raion. Population near 638 people. Local government - Pidhaychyky village council.

Pidhaychyky is located on the road Lviv - Ternopil, Kropyvnytskyi, 37 km west of Zolochiv. Population in 1900 was 793 persons; in 1943 - 801 persons; in 1968 - 1109 persons.

There is secondary school in the village. Pidhaichyky was first mentioned in written sources in 1397. 

The village council area includes: 

Kosychi (Kasychi, Alfredivka) - in 1900 - 339 persons; in 1943 - 456 persons. 
Pogoriltsy - in 1900 - 768 persons; in 1943 - 727 persons. 
Turkotyn - in 1900 - 513 persons; in 1943 - 522 persons.

References

Villages in Lviv Raion